Robert Choate Darnton (born May 10, 1939) is an American cultural historian and academic librarian who specializes in 18th-century France.

He was director of the Harvard University Library from 2007 to 2016.

Life
Darnton was born in New York City. He graduated from Phillips Academy in 1957 and Harvard University in 1960, attended Oxford University on a Rhodes scholarship, and earned a PhD (DPhil) in history from Oxford in 1964, where he studied with Richard Cobb, among others. The title of his thesis was Trends in radical propaganda on the eve of the French Revolution (1782–1788).  He worked as reporter at The New York Times from 1964 to 1965. He was a Junior Fellow in the Harvard Society of Fellows from 1965 to 1968. Joining the Princeton University faculty in 1968, he was appointed Shelby Cullom Davis Professor of European History and was awarded a MacArthur Fellowship in 1982. He was president of the International Society for Eighteenth-Century Studies from 1987 to 1991, where he founded the East-West Seminar, now continued as the International Seminar for Early Career Scholars. He served as president of the American Historical Association in 1999, where he founded the Gutenberg-e Program, sponsored by Mellon Foundation.

Darnton was a trustee of the Oxford University Press from 1994 to 2007. He is a trustee of the New York Public Library, where he designed and helped launch the Dorothy and Lewis B. Cullman Center for Scholars and Writers. 

On July 1, 2007, he transferred to emeritus status at Princeton, and was appointed Carl H. Pforzheimer University Professor and director of the Harvard University Library, succeeding Sidney Verba. As University Librarian, he co-founded the Digital Public Library of America and he designed the digital archive Colonial North America: Worlds of Change. In January 2016, Ann Blair succeeded him as the Carl H. Pforzheimer University Professor.

Darnton is a pioneer in the field of the history of the book, and has written about electronic publishing.

Awards and honors
His first major prize was the Leo Gershoy Award for The Business of Enlightenment in 1979. He was later elected to the American Academy of Arts and Sciences in 1980 and the American Philosophical Society in 1989. He has also received the National Book Critics Circle Award for criticism for The Forbidden Best-Sellers of Pre-Revolutionary France (New York: W.W. Norton, 1996).

In 1999, he was named a Chevalier of the Légion d'Honneur, an award given by the French government, in recognition of his work.

In 2005, he received an award for distinguished achievement from the American Printing History Association.

On February 13, 2012, he was awarded the National Humanities Medal 2011 by President Barack Obama, for his determination to make knowledge accessible to everyone.

In 2013, he was awarded the Prix mondial Cino Del Duca lifetime achievement award by the Institut de France.

Family
His brother is the retired New York Times editor and author John Darnton, and his father was the war correspondent Byron Darnton.

Works

 
 
 
 
 Coauthored with Daniel Roche: 
 
 
 
 
 
 
 
 
 
 
 
  (author website)

See also
 History of the book

References

External links

 Author website
 Darnton on the Gutenberg-e Program
 Articles by Robert Darnton from The New York Review of Books
 
 Robert Darnton, An Early Information Society: News and the Media in Eighteenth-Century Paris,  AHA Presidential Address Retrieved April 19, 2010
 
Interview with Darnton on George Washington’s False Teeth: An Unconventional Guide to the Eighteenth Century,  Booknotes, August 31, 2003.

1939 births
Living people
Phillips Academy alumni
Harvard University alumni
Alumni of Nuffield College, Oxford
21st-century American historians
American male non-fiction writers
American information and reference writers
American librarians
American Rhodes Scholars
Fellows of St John's College, Oxford
MacArthur Fellows
Princeton University faculty
Harvard University faculty
Harvard University librarians
Chevaliers of the Légion d'honneur
Presidents of the American Historical Association
National Humanities Medal recipients
Members of the Académie royale de langue et de littérature françaises de Belgique
21st-century American male writers
Members of the American Philosophical Society
Microhistorians